Renaico is a city and commune forming part of the Malleco Province in the Araucanía Region in southern Chile. The city is located on the south bank of the Renaico River.

Demographics
Of these, 6,878 (75.4%) lived in urban areas and 2,250 (24.6%) in rural areas. The population fell by 0.8% (69 persons) between the 1992 and 2002 censuses.

Administration
As a commune, Renaico is a third-level administrative division of Chile administered by a municipal council, headed by an alcalde who is directly elected every four years. The 2008-2012 alcalde is Ivonne Morales Urra (Ind.). 

Within the electoral divisions of Chile, Renaico is represented in the Chamber of Deputies by Gonzalo Arenas (UDI) and Mario Venegas (PDC) as part of the 48th electoral district, together with Angol, Collipulli, Ercilla, Los Sauces, Purén, Lumaco and Traiguén. The commune is represented in the Senate by Alberto Espina Otero (RN) and Jaime Quintana Leal (PPD) as part of the 14th senatorial constituency (Araucanía-North).

References

External links
  Municipality of Renaico

Communes of Chile
Populated places established in 1884
Populated places in Malleco Province
1884 establishments in Chile